Myrtlewood (foaled 1932 in Kentucky) was a champion Thoroughbred race horse as well as an exceptional broodmare.

Background
Myrtlewood was by Blue Larkspur, himself by Black Servant by the great sire Black Toney, which means she went back to Ben Brush. Her dam was the French-bred Frizeur, by Sweeper, a son of another great sire, Broomstick by, again, Ben Brush. Frizeur’s dam was the racing mare Frizette (after whom the Frizette Stakes is named), by Hamburg, taking her back to Hanover, St. Simon, and Hindoo.

Racing career
Myrtlewood's best result at age two was a third-place finish in the Kentucky Jockey Club Stakes. She improved significantly at age three (when Seabiscuit was also racing but making little impact). She won the Francis S. Peabody Memorial Handicap at Lincoln Fields over a mile, and was even better at six furlongs. She set a new track record of 1:10 in the Hawthorne Sprint Handicap and a new world record of 1:09 in an allowance race at Arlington Park.

At four in 1936, she made ten starts under jockey George South and won eight, seven of which were stakes races. In the Lakeside Handicap, she equaled the track record of 1:35 for a mile, which was a world record for a female. In the Cadillac Handicap, she set a track record at the Detroit Race Course for six furlongs in 1:10. In the Motor City Handicap, she stretched out to a distance of  miles, and defeated Seabiscuit while setting another track record.

Myrtlewood was involved in match races with two exceptional racers of her day, one a colt, Clang (winner of the 1936 Clark Handicap), the other a filly, Miss Merriment (starting in 77 races and a winner or placer 2/3s of the time). Myrtlewood won her match with Miss Merriment under a hand drive. In the Midwest, both Clang and Myrtlewood had set records. Myrtlewood had beaten the time established by Iron Mask for six furlongs while Clang had equaled Roseben’s seven furlong record. After Myrtlewood beat Clang three times, a match race was proposed. In the first at Hawthorne Race Course, Myrtlewood beat Clang a fourth time, winning by a nose. In their second meeting in Cincinnati, Clang beat her by a nose.

Myrtlewood was named the Champion Older Female Horse and Champion Sprinter of 1936.

Breeding record
Myrtlewood proved a splendid broodmare, producing two great fillies: Durazna, the champion two-year-old in 1943, and Miss Dogwood, winner of the 1942 Kentucky Oaks. Both of these became outstanding producers themselves, as did five of her other daughters. The family became one of the most prominent in North America and includes Triple Crown champion Seattle Slew and leading sire Mr. Prospector.

Mrytlewood was inducted into the Hall of Fame in 1979. She is one of 24 mares covered in the book Matriarchs: Great Mares of the 20th Century by Edward L. Bowen.

Pedigree

Myrtlewood is inbred 5S x 4D to Ben Brush, meaning this sire appears in the fifth generation on the sire's side of the pedigree and in the fourth generation on the dam's side. She is also inbred 5S x 5D to Bend Or.

References

 "Champions, The Lives, Times, and Past Performances of America's Greatest Thoroughbreds, Revised Edition, Champions from 1893-2004," the Daily Racing Form

1932 racehorse births
1960 racehorse deaths
Racehorses bred in Kentucky
Racehorses trained in the United States
United States Thoroughbred Racing Hall of Fame inductees
Thoroughbred family 13-c
Horse racing track record setters